Thundergod is a 1928 American silent drama film directed by Charles J. Hunt and starring Cornelius Keefe, Lila Lee and Walter Long. An independent production, it is based on a short story by James Oliver Curwood.

Plot
After his girlfriend leaves him, a city man goes to work in a lumber camp owned by a woman whose rivals are trying to put her out of business.

Cast
 Cornelius Keefe as Roland Hale 
 Lila Lee as Enid Bryant 
 Walter Long as Bruce Drossler 
 Helen Lynch as Alyce 
 Ray Hallor as Ollie Sanderson 
 Jules Cowles as Clinky

References

Bibliography
 Munden, Kenneth White. The American Film Institute Catalog of Motion Pictures Produced in the United States, Part 1. University of California Press, 1997.

External links

1928 films
1928 drama films
Silent American drama films
American silent feature films
1920s English-language films
American black-and-white films
Films directed by Charles J. Hunt
Films set in forests
Films based on works by James Oliver Curwood
1920s American films